Duffy's Cut is the name given to a stretch of railroad tracks about  west of Philadelphia, Pennsylvania, originally built for the Philadelphia and Columbia Railroad in the summer and fall of 1832. The line later became part of the Pennsylvania Railroad's Main Line. Railroad contractor Philip Duffy hired 57 Irish immigrants to lay this line through the area's densely wooded hills and ravines. The workers came to Philadelphia from the Ulster counties of Donegal, Tyrone and Londonderry to work in Pennsylvania's nascent railroad industry. While their fates are unclear, a theory based on a record from a railroad archive suggests all 57 died of cholera during the second cholera pandemic. The remains of seven have been discovered at the site, and forensic evidence suggests that some may have been murdered, perhaps due to fear of contagion as the pandemic spanned several continents over many years. While this has become the most popular theory, a coroner who studied the bones believes the alleged bullet holes and injuries were actually due to natural decomposition and post-mortem damage.

History

Immigrants generally and Irish Catholics specifically were often viewed by the owners and managers of railroad and coal mining companies as expendable components, and by Anglo-Germanic Americans as unwholesome and even dangerous.

Official record of the deaths at Duffy's Cut remained locked in the vaults of the Pennsylvania Railroad (PRR) until Joseph Tripican, a secretary to a former PRR president, removed them after the company's bankruptcy in 1970. In the 1990s, one of Tripican's grandsons, Reverend Dr. Frank Watson, discovered the papers in a file and began to research the history with his brother Dr. William Watson, Professor of History, and adjunct professors Earl Schandelmeier and John Ahtes of Immaculata University.

On June 18, 2004, a Pennsylvania state historical marker was dedicated near the site. The text of the marker reads, "Nearby is the mass grave of fifty-seven Irish immigrant workers who died in August, 1832, of cholera. They had recently arrived in the United States and were employed by a construction contractor, named Duffy, for the Philadelphia and Columbia Railroad. Prejudice against Irish Catholics contributed to the denial of care to the workers. Their illness and death typified the hazards faced by many 19th century immigrant industrial workers."

In August 2004, the site began undergoing archaeological excavation by a research team headed by Dr. William Watson from Immaculata University, Rev. Dr. Frank Watson, Earl Schandelmeier, and John Ahtes. The Duffy's Cut Project team consisted of four primary members, William Watson, Frank Watson, John Ahtes (who died in 2010) and Earl Schandelmeier at Immaculata University. On March 20, 2009, the first human bones were unearthed by researchers Robert Frank and Patrick Barry, consisting of two skulls, six teeth and eighty other bones. The researchers announced their discovery on March 24, 2009. Bone expert Janet Monge was included in the analysis of skeletal remains.
 
On March 9, 2012, the remains of five men and one woman from those who died at Duffy's Cut Shanty Town were laid to rest with a religious service at West Laurel Hill Cemetery in Bala Cynwyd, Pennsylvania. The men and woman were unearthed by researchers from Immaculata University at the location of the Shanty Town near an Amtrak railroad line in Pennsylvania. A sixth body was recovered and identified as John Ruddy from Inishowen, County Donegal; his remains were returned to Ireland for reburial there. In 2013 the remains of Catherine Burns of County Tyrone who died in Duffy's Cut in 1832 were reburied in Ireland in 2015 Excavation of the deep burial site was halted when Amtrak, which owns the land, would not issue permits for additional digging because of the site's proximity to the railroad tracks.

In popular culture

Television
Tile Films of Dublin, Ireland produced "The Ghost of Duffy’s Cut", a documentary on the story for broadcast on the Irish State Broadcaster RTÉ. They then went on to produce a follow-up with WNET, "Death on the Railroad". as an episode of the PBS series Secrets of the Dead (season 12, episode 3) first aired May 8, 2013 and RTÉ. In this episode, the claim was made that modern forensic science determined that the 57 Irish railroad workers did not perish as the result of cholera, but instead were murdered. No conclusion was drawn as to motive, although many theories were offered.
The American TV Series Secrets of the Underground presented the Duffy's Cut grave story in the first part of the show's episode entitled "America's Buried Massacre" (Season 1, Episode 4).

Print
Greenwood Publishing Group published The Ghosts of Duffy's Cut in July 2006.
Duffy's Cut is a key setting in Paul Lynch's 2013 novel Red Sky in Morning.
In 2018, authors and researchers William E. and J. Francis Watson published the true crime book Massacre at Duffy's Cut: Tragedy and Conspiracy on the Pennsylvania Railroad. 

Music
Irish musician Christy Moore released a song, written by Wally Page, called "Duffy's Cut" (2009), whose subject matter is the death of the workers on the railway. 
In March 2011, Celtic Punk band The Dropkick Murphys released a song called "The Hardest Mile", which also deals with the newly discovered evidence that some of the men may have been murdered rather than having died of cholera.
Americana Songwriter Rick Shelley released the song "Dead Horse Hollow" in 2017. The song references young John Ruddy and the 56 other Irish immigrants lost to Duffy's cut.
In 2012, Celtic Punk band The Kilmaine Saints released “57” as part of their album “Drunken Redemption”. This discusses the anti-Irish sentiment in the 1840s and the fact that some may have been murdered.

Gallery

See also

References

External links 

Transportation in Chester County, Pennsylvania
Landmarks in Pennsylvania
Irish-American history
Irish-American culture in Philadelphia
Irish-American culture in Pennsylvania
+
1832 in the United States
Railway cuts in the United States
Cholera monuments and memorials